Jamilah Lemieux (July 22, 1984) is an American writer, cultural critic, and editor. She rose to prominence for her blog, The Beautiful Struggler. She has worked for Ebony, Cassius Magazine, and Interactive One, part of Radio One, Inc. Lemieux currently writes a parenting column for Slate, and co-hosts an accompanying podcast, Mom & Dad Are Fighting.

Early life
Lemieux was born and raised in Chicago, Illinois. Her father is David Lemieux, a former member of the Black Panther Party, who appeared in the 1973 film The Spook Who Sat by the Door.  Her mother was active with the Student Nonviolent Coordinating Committee.

Lemieux received her bachelor's degree from Howard University. She is a member of the Alpha Kappa Alpha sorority.

Career

Writing 
After graduating from Howard University, she began her writing career through blogging and mainstream media. Her blog, The Beautiful Struggler, primarily centered on the topics of race and romantic relationships. She is a three-time Black Weblog Awards winner.

In 2011, Lemieux became the news and lifestyle editor for Ebony.com. She was promoted to senior editor in 2014. In late 2015, she became the senior editor for the print magazine.

Lemieux's writing has appeared in publications such as Mic, Essence, The Nation, The Washington Post, The New York Times, and The Guardian. Her writing generally centers cultural issues from a feminist perspective.

Other work 
In 2009, she penned An Open Letter to Tyler Perry for NPR’s All Things Considered. She also appears a TV commentator for networks such as  CNN, MSNBC, NPR, and ABC, and she has been a guest on Comedy Central's The Nightly Show, MTV2's Uncommon Sense,  Vice's Desus & Mero, as well as Revolt/Power 105.1's The Breakfast Club. She appeared as a commentator in the Surviving R. Kelly documentary series.

In 2016, she became the vice president of news and men's programming for Interactive One, part of Radio One, Inc. As a part of her work there she developed Cassius, a digital magazine for millennials of color.

Lemieux joined the Cynthia Nixon 2018 gubernatorial campaign as a communications advisor. In 2019, she worked as a consultant for Elizabeth Warren's presidential campaign.

Personal life
Lemieux has one daughter, Naima (b. 2013).

Accolades 
 The Root, Root 100 (2014)
Planned Parenthood, PPFA Media Awards, Excellence in Commentary (2015)
 BBC, 100 Women (2016)

References

External links
 Official website

1984 births
African-American journalists
African-American women journalists
African-American women writers
Living people
Howard University alumni
American columnists
People from Chicago
Journalists from Illinois
Writers from Chicago
African-American writers
American women columnists
BBC 100 Women
American feminist writers
21st-century African-American people
21st-century African-American women
20th-century African-American people
20th-century African-American women